Reverie is the second mixtape by American recording artist Tinashe, first released September 6, 2012 via her official website. The mixtape followed the release of her debut mixtape In Case We Die which came after a four-year stint as lead singer of dance-pop group The Stunners and her array of non-album singles, including a collaboration with producers OFM, "Artificial People", in 2011.

As executive producer, Tinashe enlisted a variety of musical producers to work with her on the mixtape, including Wes Tarte, BMarz of the Hills Club, Nez & Rio, Best Kept Secret, B. Hendrixx, Troobadore, K-BeatZ, Daughter, XXYYXX, Roc & Mayne, and JRB The Producer. Besides being executive producer of the mixtape, Tinashe also wrote all of the mixtape's songs. Musically, Reverie doesn't stray far from the same PBR&B and alternative hip hop sound that In Case We Die included, though the mixtape also touches on several new genres such as electronica, glitch hop, indie pop, post-dubstep and alternative rock.

The mixtape was preceded by the release of the lead single "Stargazing" which was released on August 21, 2012. "Stargazing" became the number one must-hear song on MTV "Buzzworthy" on August 28, 2012. The second single "Ecstasy" was released on December 18, 2012, and the music video for the final single from the mixtape, "Who Am I Working For?", was released on March 12, 2013. The album's title track was used during a scene of the American television program Love & Hip Hop.

Reverie received positive reviews from music critics, who complimented the mixtape's "spacey beats and Middle Eastern influences", with some critics calling it "highly anticipated" and "must listen" and praising Tinashe's vocals. Other critics compared the artistic style of the mixtape to that of Jhene Aiko, The Weeknd and Aaliyah.

Background
After being part of the pop-dance girl group the Stunners for 4 years, Tinashe left the group to pursue a solo career. On December 20, 2011, Tinashe announced that she would release a mixtape, titled In Case We Die, in 2012. After releasing 4 singles which reached over one million digital downloads, RCA Records signed Tinashe, with her official debut album being released October 7, 2014.
On August 5, 2012, Tinashe announced that she was ready to release her second pro
ect, titled Reverie. After uploading a trailer of the mixtape on her YouTube channel, it was confirmed that the mixtape's name was Reverie. The official cover was revealed via Instagram on August 13, 2012. On September 1, 2012, she disclosed to her followers on Twitter that the release of Reverie was set for September 6, 2012.

Development
Throughout the recording of the mixtape, Reverie was self-composed, engineered, and mastered entirely in Tinashe's bedroom - much like her previous work. Tinashe was the executive producer for Reverie, however she did also work with various producers from her first project, In Case We Die such as, K-BeatZ, Wes Tarte and B. Hendrixx as well as new producers BMarz of the Hills Club, 
Nez & Rio, Best Kept Secret, Troobadore, Roc & Mayne, JRB The Producer as well as virally famous producer XXYYXX.

Tinashe took to her official blog to explain the meaning behind the mixtape and its French title Reverie (which means "to daydream"):

Critical reception
Reviews for Reverie were generally positive, with the comments on popular mixtape site DatPiff being positive, as well as receiving promotional space on the main page of DatPiff and peaking at number five on the most downloaded chart upon the first day of its release and drawing comparisons to Aaliyah via fans on social networking site Twitter.

MuuMuse.com called the first single, "Stargazing", "absolutely mesmerizing" and also compared her to indie band The xx. La Dulce Locura compared the mixtape to Jhene Aiko, "but with a little more power". Yakk stated that this mixtape will "further The Weeknd comparisons" which Tinashe received on her first mixtape In Case We Die but added "the slow spacey beat and Middle Eastern influences" of "Who Am I Working For?" "[created] something way too sensual. Combined with Tinashe’s sweet voice, and it’s no wonder RCA Records picked up on her. She really is one talented girl." Fake Shore Drive also complimented the Nez & Rio-produced track "Who Am I Working For?", choosing it as a standout from the mixtape.

BallerStatus.com and The Dope Delivery praised the effort, complementing Tinashe's vocals. Global Grind called the tape "highly anticipated" as well as classifying it as a "must listen". DJ Kelly J said "Though her voice is extremely angelic, her music always results with an innovative, and extremely edgy sound." Soul Culture gave the mixtape a positive review, saying "In addition to the beautifully enchanting (and at times haunting) vocals and production that made In Case We Die so appealing, the artist also introduces some new elements and influences to the gumbo that is her soundscape giving us another outstanding audio experience."

Denver Sean of LoveBScott.com noted "BMarz of the Hills Club’s flawless production" of the first single, saying "Stargazing, takes a similar approach to, Noah “40″ Shebib’s productions, but it’s as if he strapped one to a rocket and shot it into the galaxy."

Track listing

Sampling credits
 Track 5 samples the song "Love" by Daughter.

Release history

References

External links
Tinashe's Official Website

2012 mixtape albums
Albums produced by Best Kept Secret (production team)
Tinashe albums